School Reading List is a British online website covering children's books.

Launched in 2011, it includes age group lists for school classes, children's and YA book reviews, 'books of the month', and resources. The School Reading List website says it's recommendations are "curated and reviewed by a small group of librarians, English teachers and parents who discuss books that have worked well with groups of children". The company is based in London. and operates a sister site, K-12readinglist.com in the USA.

See also

References

External links
 School Reading List website

Children's literature organizations